The Harvey O. Banks Pumping Plant is located  southwest of the Clifton Court Forebay and  northwest of Tracy, CA. The plant is the first pumping plant for the California Aqueduct and the South Bay Aqueduct. The Banks Pumping Plant initially flows into the Bethany Reservoir. It is from the Bethany Reservoir that the South Bay Aqueduct begins.

The John E. Skinner Delta Fish Protective Facility is located 2 miles upstream from the facility and prevents fishes from reaching the pumping plant.

Limits on water pumping from the Sacramento Delta is a politically contentious issue. In dry years, water pumped from the Delta creates a hazard to spring-run salmon. As the Banks Pumping Plant pulls water from the Sacramento River southward across the Delta, it disrupts the normal flow direction of east to west that salmon smolt follow to the Pacific Ocean. Populations of salmon and steelhead trout have reached critically low levels in the decades after SWP water withdrawals began. The fish migration issue has become hotly contested in recent years, with rising support for the construction of the Peripheral Canal, which would divert water around the Delta, restoring the natural flow direction.

Characteristics
 Number of units: 11
 Normal static head: 
 Total flow at design head: 10,920 ft³/s (302 m³/s) (21,659 acre-feet/day)
 Total motor rating: 333,000 hp (248 MW)

References

External links
 Banks plant sensor data

California State Water Project
Buildings and structures in Alameda County, California
Buildings and structures in Contra Costa County, California
Water supply infrastructure in California
Water supply pumping stations in the United States
Sacramento–San Joaquin River Delta